Jimmy Elsby was Treasurer of the Labour Party in Great Britain during 2001–04.

He was also an assistant general secretary of the Transport and General Workers' Union. He was a candidate for general secretary in 2003.

External links
article mentions him

British trade unionists
Living people
21st-century British people
Year of birth missing (living people)
Place of birth missing (living people)
Labour Party (UK) officials